Niedziałki may refer to the following places:
Niedziałki, Masovian Voivodeship (east-central Poland)
Niedziałki, Świętokrzyskie Voivodeship (south-central Poland)
Niedziałki, Warmian-Masurian Voivodeship (north Poland)